Żelichowska may refer to:

People
Aleksandra Żelichowska (born 1984), Polish figure skater

Geography
Kuźnica Żelichowska, village in Czarnków-Trzcianka County, Greater Poland Voivodeship, in west-central Poland
Pilcza Żelichowska, village in Dąbrowa County, Lesser Poland Voivodeship, in southern Poland
Wola Żelichowska, village in Dąbrowa County, Lesser Poland Voivodeship, in southern Poland

See also
Żelechowa
Żelichów (disambiguation)